Tan Zongliang (born November 29, 1971) is a male Chinese sports shooter who competed at five consecutive Olympics from 1996 to 2012. He has won two consecutive ISSF World Shooting Championships in 50 metre pistol: in 2002 in Lahti and in 2006 in Zagreb. At the 2008 Summer Olympics, he won the bronze medal in the same event, a medal that was upgraded to silver after Kim Jong-su's disqualification for use of the banned drug, propranolol.

References

External links

 profile

1971 births
Living people
Chinese male sport shooters
ISSF pistol shooters
Olympic shooters of China
Olympic silver medalists for China
People from Weifang
Shooters at the 1996 Summer Olympics
Shooters at the 2000 Summer Olympics
Shooters at the 2004 Summer Olympics
Shooters at the 2008 Summer Olympics
Shooters at the 2012 Summer Olympics
Asian Games medalists in shooting
Olympic medalists in shooting
Sport shooters from Shandong
Medalists at the 2008 Summer Olympics
Shooters at the 1998 Asian Games
Shooters at the 2002 Asian Games
Shooters at the 2006 Asian Games
Shooters at the 2010 Asian Games
Asian Games gold medalists for China
Asian Games silver medalists for China
Medalists at the 1998 Asian Games
Medalists at the 2002 Asian Games
Medalists at the 2006 Asian Games
Medalists at the 2010 Asian Games
21st-century Chinese people